Life of Worship is the debut album from Jon Bauer.

Track listing
 "Your Amazing Grace" (Jon Bauer) - 3:47
 "Pray" (Jon Bauer) - 5:00
 "Life of Worship" (Jon Bauer) - 4:39
 "Born for More" (Jon Bauer) - 4:24
 "Promise (For I Know)" (Jon Bauer) - 3:54
 "Forever Unchanging" (Jon Bauer) - 4:28
 "Fix My Eyes" (Jon Bauer) - 4:41
 "My Everything" (Jon Bauer) - 4:45
 "May I Be" (Jon Bauer) - 3:47
 "How Marvelous (My Savior's Love)" (Charles H. Gabriel, arranged by Jon Bauer) - 3:40

References 

Jon Bauer albums
2005 albums